The Viewliner Train of Tomorrow was a  narrow-gauge, miniature train that once operated alongside portions of the Disneyland Railroad main line.

The attraction commenced operation on June 10, 1957 and was billed by Disneyland as "the fastest miniature train in the world." Two separate trains, designed by Disney Imagineer Bob Gurr, and built as scale replicas of General Motors' futuristic Aerotrain, traveled along a dog-bone track circuit (rail line with a turnaround loop at each end) through parts of Tomorrowland and Fantasyland. The Tomorrowland train featured cars that were named for the planets, while the cars of the Fantasyland train were named after various Disney characters.

The modern, streamlined trains were placed into service to represent the future of rail travel, in contrast to the steam-powered DRR which represented its past. Motive power for each train consisted of an integral head-end unit driven by an Oldsmobile "Rocket" V8 gasoline engine, mated to a Jeep transfer case powering drive-shafts to both the front and rear wheel trucks. Two 1954 Oldsmobile 88 2-dr coupes furnished the windscreen, doors and instrument console for each of the two  locomotives. The attraction operated until September 30, 1958 when construction began on the Matterhorn and Submarine Voyage. The Disneyland Monorail System ultimately took the place of the Viewliner in June 1959, thereby making it one of the shortest-lived rides in the park's history. The railroad ties from the attraction were later used to build the Deer Lake Park & Julian Railroad, a  narrow-gauge backyard railroad owned by Disney animator Ollie Johnston at his vacation home near Julian, California.

See also

List of former Disneyland attractions
Rail transport in Walt Disney Parks and Resorts

Notes

References

External links

1957 establishments in California
1958 disestablishments in California
2 ft 6 in gauge railways in the United States
Amusement rides introduced in 1957
Amusement rides that closed in 1958
Disneyland
Former Walt Disney Parks and Resorts attractions
Rail transport in Walt Disney Parks and Resorts
Railroads of amusement parks in the United States
Tomorrowland